Sepsis biflexuosa is a Cosmopolitan species of fly and member of the family Sepsidae.

References

Sepsidae
Diptera of Europe
Diptera of Asia
Diptera of North America
Insects described in 1893
Taxa named by Gabriel Strobl